Mathematical Operators is a Unicode block containing characters for mathematical, logical, and set notation.

Notably absent are the plus sign (+), greater than sign (>) and less than sign (<), due to them already appearing in the Basic Latin Unicode block, and the plus-or-minus sign (±), multiplication sign (×) and obelus (÷), due to them already appearing in the Latin-1 Supplement block, although a distinct minus sign (−) is included, differing from the Basic Latin hyphen-minus (-).

Block

Variation sequences
The Mathematical Operators block has sixteen variation sequences defined for standardized variants.  They use  (VS01) to denote variant symbols (depending on the font):

History
The following Unicode-related documents record the purpose and process of defining specific characters in the Mathematical Operators block:

See also 
 Mathematical operators and symbols in Unicode
 Supplemental Mathematical Operators

References

Unicode blocks
Mathematical symbols